The 2015–16 TT Pro League season (known as the Digicel Pro League for sponsorship reasons) is the seventeenth season of the TT Pro League, the Trinidad and Tobago professional league for association football clubs, since its establishment in 1999. A total of ten teams are contesting the league, with Central FC the defending champions from the 2014–15 season. The season began on 25 September 2015 and concluded on 21 May 2016 with the crowning of Central FC as the league champion.

The first goal of the season was scored by North East Stars' Alonzo Adlam against new team Club Sando in the seventeenth minute of the first round of matches on 25 September 2015. The first hat-trick of the season was recorded on 12 December 2015 by Jomal Williams of W Connection against St. Ann's Rangers in a 5–0 shutout at Ato Boldon Stadium.

Changes from the 2014–15 season
The following changes were made since the 2014–15 season:

 Dexter Skeene, Pro League CEO, announced that the prize structure would be TT$1 million awarded to the Pro League champions and TT$150,000 to the league runners-up.
 The winning club of each of the three rounds in the league will also receive TT$50,000.
 In each of the three rounds, the top player will also receive TT$10,000.
 The three rounds will be renamed in honour of former Pro League players that tragically lost their lives in the previous three years – Round 1: Raul Fletcher (Police); Round 2: Akeem Adams (Central FC); and Round 3: Kevon Carter (Defence Force).
 There were a number of changes to the clubs competing in the 2014–15 season.
 Caledonia AIA changed the name of the club to Morvant Caledonia United.
 An application from Club Sando for Pro League membership was accepted to add the tenth club to the league.

Player transfers

Managerial changes

Teams

Team summaries

Note: Flags indicate national team as has been defined under FIFA eligibility rules. Players may hold more than one non-FIFA nationality.

Stadiums

League table

Positions by round

Results

Matches 1–18

Matches 19–27

Season statistics

Scoring
 First goal of the season: Alonzo Adlam for North East Stars against Club Sando (26 September 2015)
 First own goal of the season: Kevon Villaroel (Central FC) for North East Stars (16 December 2015)
 First penalty kick of the season: Willis Plaza (scored) for Central FC against Defence Force (20 October 2015)
 First hat-trick of the season: Jomal Williams (W Connection) against St. Ann's Rangers, 2', 19', 48' (12 December 2015)
 Most goals scored by one player in a match: 4
 Jerwyn Balthazar (Defence Force) against St. Ann's Rangers, 4', 26', 45', 64' (15 January 2016)
 Widest winning margin: 8 goals
 Defence Force 8–0 Morvant Caledonia United (9 January 2016)
 Most goals in a match: 8 goals
 North East Stars 4–4 Police (20 October 2015)
 Defence Force 8–0 Morvant Caledonia United (9 January 2016)
 Most goals in a one half: 6 goals
 Defence Force v Morvant Caledonia United (9 January 2016) 6–0 at half-time, 8–0 final.
 Most goals in one half by a single team: 6 goals
 Defence Force v Morvant Caledonia United (9 January 2016) 6–0 at half-time, 8–0 final.

Top scorers

Hat-tricks

 * Home team score first in result
 4 Player scored four goals

Awards

Monthly awards

References

External links
Official Website
Soca Warriors Online, TT Pro League

TT Pro League seasons
1
Trinidad